= Senate Grove, Missouri =

Extinct town in the American state of Missouri

Coordinates: 38.575604°N 91.327935°W

Senate Grove is an extinct town in Franklin County, in the U.S. state of Missouri.

A post office called Senate Grove was established in 1891, and remained in operation until 1903. The community took its name from a nearby Methodist church of the same name.
